The  Pittsburgh Power season was the fourth season for the franchise in the Arena Football League. They played their home games at the Consol Energy Center. The 2014 season marked the franchise's first-ever winning season, after the Power victory over the Philadelphia Soul, 57-56, on June 14. A week later on June 20, the Power clinched their first-ever playoff berth with a 57–27 win over the Iowa Barnstormers. The Power finished the regular season 15–3, but lost in their first-ever playoff game to the Orlando Predators in the conference semifinals by a 56–48 score.

The team had been coached by Derek Stingley, however he was fired after a 63–53 loss to the Cleveland Gladiators in the team's first game of the season. He was replaced by Ron James as the franchise's coach.

Standings

Schedule

Regular season
The Power began the season at home against the Cleveland Gladiators on March 15. They hosted the Philadelphia Soul in their last regular season game on July 26.

Playoffs

Roster

References

Pittsburgh Power
Pittsburgh Power seasons
Pittsburgh Power